Casaroli is an Italian surname. Notable people with the surname include:

Agostino Casaroli (1914–1998), Italian cardinal and diplomat
Walter Casaroli (born 1957), Italian footballer

See also 
 La banda Casaroli

Italian-language surnames